Johann "Hans" Erik Pesser (7 November 1911 – 12 August 1986) was an Austrian football striker and coach.

Career
He earned 8 caps and scored 3 goals for the Austria national football team. After the annexation of Austria by Germany, he earned 12 caps and scored 2 goals for the Germany national football team, and participated in the 1938 FIFA World Cup. He spent his club career at SK Rapid Wien, and later also managed the team, and also briefly managed the Austria national team. As coach he reached 7 titles in the Austrian championship and three Austrian Cups.

Honours

as player
Rapid Wien(4 x Austrian Champion 1935, 1938, 1940, 1941;German Cup 1938;German Champion 1941)

as coach
Rapid Wien(1945-52: 4 x Austrian Champion, 1 x Austrian Cup, 1x Zentropacup)
Wiener Sportklub (1953–1960: 2 x Austrian Champion)
Admira (1 x Austrian Champion, 2 x Austrian Cup)

References

1911 births
1986 deaths
Footballers from Vienna
Association football forwards
Austrian footballers
Austria international footballers
German footballers
Germany international footballers
SK Rapid Wien players
1938 FIFA World Cup players
Dual internationalists (football)
Austrian football managers
SK Rapid Wien managers
Austria national football team managers
Wiener Sport-Club managers